Theodore Cressy Skeat (15 February 1907 — 25 June 2003) was a librarian at the British Museum, where he worked as Assistant Keeper (from 1931), Deputy Keeper (from 1948), and Keeper of Manuscripts and Egerton Librarian (from 1961 to 1972).

Skeat was educated at Whitgift School, Croydon and Christ's College, Cambridge, where he graduated with a Second-class BA in the Classical Tripos in 1929. Following a further short spell as a student at the British School of Archaeology in Athens, he was recruited by the British Museum in 1931. His work coincided with two important acquisitions by the Trustees of the aforementioned institution, namely the Codex Sinaiticus and the apocryphal Gospel Egerton 2 Papyrus (a.k.a. the Egerton Gospel). He made a name for himself with important contributions to palaeography, papyrology, and codicology, particularly—but not only—in relation to these two acquisitions. He was the grandson of noted philologist Walter William Skeat.

Skeat was elected a Fellow of the British Academy in 1963, but resigned (along with his friend Colin Roberts) in 1979, in protest against its decision not to expel Anthony Blunt after the latter was exposed as a former Soviet spy.

Obituaries 
J. Keith Elliott, Theodore Cressy Skeat, TC: A Journal of Biblical Textual Criticism, 2003.
J. Keith Elliott, Obituary: T. C. Skeat, The Independent, July 8, 2003.
Dorothy J. Thompson, In memoriam Theodore Cressy SKEAT, 2004.

Select bibliography 
 H. I. Bell, and T. C. Skeat (eds.), Fragments of an Unknown Gospel and other early Christian papyri, London: Trustees of the British Museum, 1935. 
 H. J. M. Milne, and T. C. Skeat, Scribes and Correctors of the Codex Sinaiticus, London: Trustees of the British Museum, 1938. 
 C. H. Roberts, and T. C. Skeat, The Birth of the Codex, Oxford University Press, New York – Cambridge 1983. 
 T. C. Skeat, The collected Biblical writings of T. C. Skeat, ed. J. K. Elliott, Supplements to Novum Testamentum 113, Leiden and Boston: Brill, 2004.

References

External links 

Alumni of Christ's College, Cambridge
English librarians
1907 births
2003 deaths
Employees of the British Library
Fellows of the British Academy